

Introduction 
Established in 1960, the Ministry of Justice of Niger provides litigants and citizens with the means of the judicial system (magistrates, clerks, courts and paralegals) for access to justice.

List of ministers

First Republic Under President Diori Hamani 

 Boubacar Diallo (1960-1963)
 Issoufou Saidou Djermakoye (1963-1965)
 Mom Dan Dobi (1965-1970) 
 Amadou Issaka (1970)
 Barkiré Halidou (1970-1974)

Regime of Seyni Kountche 

 Sory Diallo Mamadou (1974-1975)
 Dupuis Henry Yacouba (1975-1976)
 Mamadou Malam Aouami (1976-1979)
 Alou Harouna (1979-1982)
 Mahamadou Halilou Sabo (1982-1983)
 Allele El Hadji Habibou (1983-1985)
 Hadj Nadjir (1985-1987)
 Mallam Oubandawaki (1987)

Regime of the Second Republic of General Ali Seybou 

 Abdourahamane Soly (1987-1989)
 Ali Bondiare (1989-1991)

First Transition Under Cheffou Amadou as Prime Minister, Head of Government 

 Issaka Sounna (1991-1992)
 Abdou Tchousso (1992-1993)

Third Republic Under President Mahamane Ousmane 

 Kandine Mallam Adam (1993-1994)
 Tahirou Amadou (1994-1995)
 Ibrahim Beidou (1995-1996)

Fourth Republic: Regime of General Ibrahim Bare Mainassara 

 Boubé Oumarou (1996-1997)
 Abba Musa Issoufou (1997-1999)

Regime under Commander Daouda Malam Wanké 

 Mahaman Laouali Dan-Dah (1999-2000)

Fifth and Sixth Republic of Mamadou Tandja 

 Ali Sirfi Maiga (2000-2001)
 Maty El Hadji Moussa (2001-2007)
 Mamadou Dagra (2007-2009)
 Garba Lompo (2009-2010)

Regime of the Military Transition of Salou Djibo 

 Abdoulaye Djibo (2010-2011)

Seventh Republic Under President Issoufou Mahamadou 

 Marou Amadou (2011-2021)

Seventh Republic Under Président Mohamed Bazoum 
 Dr Boubakar Hassan (2021-)

See also 

 Justice ministry
 Politics of Niger

References 

Justice ministries
Government of Niger
Ministries established in 1960
1960 establishments in Niger